Neil Oliver "Bing" Russell (May 5, 1926 – April 8, 2003) was an American actor and Class A minor-league baseball club owner. He was the father of Hollywood actor Kurt Russell and grandfather of ex–major league baseball player Matt Franco and actor Wyatt Russell.

Early life
Russell was born in Brattleboro, Vermont, the son of Ruth Stewart (née Vogel) and Warren Oliver Russell. He always wanted to become an actor and studied drama at Brattleboro High School. He grew up around the New York Yankees’ spring training camp in St. Petersburg, Florida, in the 1930s and 1940s, where his father ran a floatplane service.  As a result, he was an unofficial mascot of the New York Yankees, and became friendly with players including Lefty Gomez and Joe DiMaggio. When Lou Gehrig was weakened by illness, he gave Russell the bat he used to hit his last home run before retiring.

Russell graduated from Dartmouth College with a business degree.

Career
Russell made his debut in the film Cavalry Patrol, and had some uncredited roles in his early career.

Best known as Deputy Clem Foster on Bonanza (1959) and Robert in The Magnificent Seven (1960), he guest-starred in episodes of many television series, including Playhouse 90, Highway Patrol, Wagon Train, The Life and Legend of Wyatt Earp, The Loretta Young Show, Johnny Ringo, Walt Disney's Wonderful World of Color, The Rifleman, Maverick, Zane Grey Theater, Route 66, Rawhide, Ben Casey, The Untouchables, Hazel, The Andy Griffith Show, The Twilight Zone, The Donna Reed Show, The Munsters, Gunsmoke, Combat!, Branded, The Fugitive, The Monkees, I Dream of Jeannie, Ironside, The Big Valley, Death Valley Days, Adam-12, The Virginian, Alias Smith and Jones, The Mod Squad, Mannix, The Rockford Files, The Streets of San Francisco, Emergency!, and Little House on the Prairie.

In 1963, he was cast as John Quigley, a Chicago mobster, in the episode "Five Tickets to Hell" of Jack Webb's CBS anthology series, GE True. In the storyline, Quigley travels to Chihuahua, Mexico, where he robs the mint of $500,000 and kills seven men in the commission of the crime. Police Lieutenant Juan Garcia (Carlos Romero) tracks down Quigley and his three accomplices. BarBara Luna also appears in the episode.

Russell appeared in the original pilot (filmed in November 1965) for The Monkees TV series as Rudy, a record store owner and the group's manager; after the show was greenlit by NBC, the concept of a manager was discarded and Russell's character was not retained. An edited version of this pilot, in which Russell appears, was broadcast as a regular episode of the first season, and is part of the show's syndication package to this day.

Russell much later played Vernon Presley to his son Kurt's Elvis Presley in the television movie, Elvis (1979). Kurt, as a child actor, had appeared with the real Elvis in the film It Happened at the World's Fair, and in a later interview recalled the singer-actor, professing to be a fan, asking to meet Bing, who had accompanied his son to the set.

Russell owned the Portland Mavericks, the only independent team in the Short Season Northwest League. Russell kept a 30-man roster because he believed that some of the players deserved to have one last season. His motto was fun. He created a park that kept all corporate sponsorship outside the gates, hired the first female general manager, Lanny Moss in professional baseball, and named the first Asian American GM/Manager. His team set a record for the highest attendance in minor league history, but lost the 1977 pennant to the Bellingham Mariners. Subsequently, Major League Baseball regained interest in Portland.  The Albuquerque, NM franchise relocated to Portland (for nine years) and resurrected the Class AAA Portland Beavers name. The Portland area was recovered but was forced to pay $206,000 to Russell after he took the matter to arbitration; it was the biggest payout in baseball history for a minor league territory. Ex-major-leaguers and never-weres who could not stop playing the game flocked to his June try-outs, which were always open to anyone who showed up. The team and archival footage of Russell were featured in the documentary The Battered Bastards of Baseball (2014).

Personal life 
In 1945, while working at Teddy's Restaurant in Newport, New Hampshire, a coworker introduced Russell to his future wife, Louise "Lulu" Crone. Russell and Crone married in 1946 and had four children together, including actor Kurt Russell.

Death
Russell died from complications of cancer on April 8, 2003, in Thousand Oaks, California.

Recognition
In 1974, the Sporting News named Russell minor league executive of the year.

In 2020, he was inducted into the Hall of Great Westerners of the National Cowboy & Western Heritage Museum.

Filmography

The Living Christ Series (1951) as Lazarus
Big Leaguer (1953) as Undetermined Role (uncredited)
Soldier (1953, TV series) as Sgt. Corbett
The Public Defender (1954, TV series) as 2nd Cop
Crashout (1955) as Young Man with Girl in Bar (uncredited)
Kiss Me Deadly (1955) as Police Detective (uncredited)
Cult of the Cobra (1955) as Laundry Man (uncredited)
Tarantula (1955) as Deputy (uncredited)
Lucy Gallant (1955) as One of Casey's Air Force Buddies (uncredited)
You Are There (1953–1955, TV Series) as Disheartened Soldier
Cavalry Patrol (1956, TV Movie) as Jenner
The Price of Fear (1956) as Maxie (uncredited)
Behind the High Wall (1956) as Guard (uncredited)
Attack (1956) as Medic (uncredited)
Science Fiction Theatre (1956, TV Series) as Radio Operator
Highway Patrol (1956–1957, TV Series) as Toby Larkin
Teenage Thunder (1957) as Used-car salesman
Drango (1957) as Lieutenant with Supply Wagon
The True Story of Jesse James (1957) as Jayhawker Sergeant (uncredited)
Fear Strikes Out (1957) as Ballplayer Holding Trophy (uncredited)
The Land Unknown (1957) as Navy Radio Operator (uncredited)
Navy Log (1956–1957, TV Series) as Bob Harris
The Ford Television Theatre (1957, TV Series) as Lieutenant Young
The Silent Service (1957, TV Series) as Lieutenant Jackson
The Deadly Mantis (1957) as State Trooper at Train & Bus Wrecks (uncredited)
Hellcats of the Navy (1957) as Frogman on Submarine (uncredited)
Bailout at 43,000 (1957) as Flyer at Bar (uncredited)
Gunfight at the O.K. Corral (1957) as Harry (Griffin bartender) (uncredited)
Playhouse 90 (1957, TV Series)
Beau James (1957) as Reporter (uncredited)
The Land Unknown (1957) as Radio operator (uncredited)
The Web (1957, TV Series) as Police Officer
The Walter Winchell File (1957, TV Series)
Harbor Command (1957, TV Series) as Jim
Casey Jones (1957, TV Series) as Baylor
Wagon Train (1957, TV Series) as Private Cullen
Bombers B-52 (1957) as Operator (uncredited)
Ride a Violent Mile (1957) as Corporal Norman
Tombstone Territory (1957, TV Series) as Ollie Williams
Suspicion (1957, TV Series) as Mechanic
Teenage Thunder (1957) as Used-Car Salesman
Flight (1958, TV Series) as Pilot
The Life and Legend of Wyatt Earp (1958, TV Series) as Sergeant Turner
The Lady Takes a Flyer (1958) as First Tower Controller (uncredited)
Suicide Battalion (1958) as Lt. Chet Hall
The Loretta Young Show (1955–1958, TV Series) as Convict
Sugarfoot (1958, TV Series) as Sergeant McKinnock
Cattle Empire (1958) as Douglas Hamilton
The Lineup (1958, TV Series) as Theodore
Northwest Passage (1958, TV Series) as Pvt. Ben Smith
Good Day for a Hanging (1959) as George Fletcher
Rio Bravo (1959) as Cowboy murdered in saloon (uncredited)
Colt .45 (1958–1959, TV Series) as Jack Lowden
The Horse Soldiers (1959) as Dunker, Yankee Soldier Amputee
Last Train from Gun Hill (1959) as Skag, Belden Hand
The Texan (1959, TV Series) as Larry Boland
Black Saddle (1959, TV Series) as Ken Wilson
Johnny Ringo (1959, TV Series) as Dick Walsh
Disneyland (1959, TV Series) as Arne
Texas John Slaughter (1959, TV Series) as Arne
Tales of Wells Fargo (1959, TV Series) as Captain Maynard
The Alaskans (1960, TV Series) as Edward Carse
Wanted: Dead or Alive (1959–1960, TV Series) as Billy Hemp
Gunsmoke (1960) as Garve Tabor
Shotgun Slade (1960, TV Series) as Deputy U.S. Marshal Benton
Wrangler (1960, TV Series) as Ritter
Tate (1960, TV Series) as Corey
The Rifleman (1959–1960, TV Series) as Hode Evans & Sanchez
The Magnificent Seven (1960) as Robert, (Henry's traveling companion)
Dick Powell's Zane Grey Theater (1956–1960, TV Series) as Cole
Bonanza (1961–1973) (TV series) as Deputy Clem Foster
The Great Impostor (1961) as Morgan (uncredited)
Surfside 6 (1961, TV Series) as Ron Kaslow
Saint of Devil's Island (1961) as Gerard
The Brothers Brannagan (1961, TV Series) as Fenner in "Tough Guy"
The Blue Angels (1961, TV Series) as Denton in episode "The Duster"
Maverick (1957–1962, TV Series) as Luke Storm
Bronco (1959–1962, TV Series) as Jeb Thomas
Rawhide (1962, TV Series) as Jack Harris
The Virginian (1962 TV series) he took on the role of Sgt. Eads, a member of Col. Teddy Roosevelt's "Rough Riders"(It's 1898 and The Spanish American War)in an episode entitled "Riff-Raff" on the first season of "The Virginian."Alcoa Premiere (1962, TV Series) as HoganBen Casey (1962, TV Series) as JohnHave Gun - Will Travel (1958–1962, TV Series) as Andy Dawes and Sheriff ReaganThe Untouchables (1961–1962, TV Series) as Officer CavanaughStakeout! (1962) as JoeThe Andy Griffith Show (1963, TV Series) as Mr. BurtonStoney Burke (1963, TV Series) as NeeleyLaramie (1960–1963, TV Series) as ReevesSam Benedict (1963, TV Series) as Len GeorgeG.E. True (1963, TV Series) as John QuigleyThe Stripper (1963) as Mr. MulvaneyA Gathering of Eagles (1963) as Captain (uncredited)The Twilight Zone (1961–1963, TV Series) as Ben BradenOne Man's Way (1964) as Tom RayburnCheyenne Autumn (1964) as Braden's Telegraph Operator (uncredited)The Donna Reed Show (1964, TV Series) as Bill GayleyThe Munsters (1965, TV Series) as The Second RangerCombat! (1965, TV Series) as GainesThe Hallelujah Trail (1965) as Horner (miner)A Man Called Shenandoah (1965, TV Series) as ClemBranded (1965–1966, TV Series) as Sheriff GormanIncident at Phantom Hill (1966) as General's Aide (uncredited)The Fugitive (1963–1966, TV Series) as DavisMadame X (1966) as Police Sgt. RileyBilly the Kid versus Dracula (1966) as Dan 'Red' ThorpeThe Monroes (1966, TV Series) as AaronThe Monkees (1966, TV Series) as Rudy GuntherRun for Your Life (1966, TV Series) as DeputyI Dream of Jeannie (1967, TV Series) as Amos LincolnRide to Hangman's Tree (1967) as Keller (uncredited)Dundee and the Culhane (1967, TV Series) as H.P. GrahamHondo (1967, TV Series) as ThompsonBlackbeard's Ghost (1968) as Second Official (uncredited)Journey to Shiloh (1968) as GreybeardIronside (1968, TV Series) as Cal BristoldThe Love Bug (1968) as Race Track Starter (uncredited)The Guns of Will Sonnett (1967–1969, TV Series) as BartenderThe Outcasts (1969, TV Series) as GrainerThe Big Valley (1965–1969, TV Series) as ClintDeath Valley Days (1961–1969, TV Series) as Jack AlvordThe Virginian (1962–1969, TV Series) as DonovanThe Virginian (1970) as Sheriff Martin credit as Neil Russell The Computer Wore Tennis Shoes (1969) as AngeloAdam-12 (1969–1970, TV Series) as JohnsonThe Young Lawyers (1970, TV Series) as McCrackenYuma (1971, TV Movie) as Rol King (as Neil Russell)The Million Dollar Duck (1971) as Mr. SmithA Taste of Evil (1971, TV Movie) as SheriffO'Hara, U.S. Treasury (1971, TV Series) as Bob RasmussenAlias Smith and Jones (1972, TV Series) as SheriffLongstreet (1972, TV Series) as Police LieutenantNow You See Him, Now You Don't (1972) as AlfredSet This Town on Fire (1973, TV Movie) as ChuckThe Mod Squad (1973, TV Series) as KernerSatan's School for Girls (1973, TV Movie) as SheriffRunaway! (1973, TV Movie) as FiremanGunsmoke (1956–1974, TV Series) as Ed ShelbyA Cry in the Wilderness (1974, TV Movie) as Mr. GriffeyThe Sex Symbol (1974, TV Movie) as Public Relations ManDeath Sentence (1974, TV Movie) as TrooperThe Rockford Files (1974, TV Series) as LieutenantMannix (1970–1974, TV Series) as George EnrightThe Apple Dumpling Gang (1975) as Herm DallyThe Streets of San Francisco (1973–1975, TV Series) as Dan RiggsEmergency! (1973–1975, TV Series) as Captain WilsonPetrocelli (1975, TV Series) as John MillerLittle House on the Prairie (1976, TV Series) as Len CotyThe New Daughters of Joshua Cabe (1976, TV Movie)Arthur Hailey's the Moneychangers (1976, TV Mini-Series) as TimberwellThe Loneliest Runner (1976, TV Movie) as Fred DawkinsElvis (1979, TV Movie) as Vernon PresleyOverboard (1987) as Sheriff Earl (Elk Cove)Sunset (1988) as Studio GuardTango & Cash (1989) as Van DriverDick Tracy'' (1990) as Club Ritz Patron #2

References

External links
 
 
 Bonanza Cast Biographies—Bing Russell
 The New York Times Movies profile

1926 births
2003 deaths
20th-century American male actors
American male film actors
American male television actors
Deaths from cancer in California
Male actors from California
Male Western (genre) film actors
Minor league baseball executives
People from Brattleboro, Vermont
Western (genre) television actors